John Stumar (30 May 1892 – 27 October 1962) was a Hungarian-American cinematographer. He was a brother of cinematographer Charles J. Stumar. He worked as a cinematographer on 130 films between 1917 and 1947.

Selected filmography
The Vamp (1918)
 A Burglar for a Night (1918)
 Prisoners of the Pines (1918)
The Marriage Ring (1918)
Quicksand (1918)
Hard Boiled (1919)
Black Is White (1920)
The Song of the Soul (1920)
Pardon My French (1921)
Anne of Little Smoky (1921)
Cardigan (1922)
Blaze Away (1922)
 The Kingdom Within (1922)
 The Super-Sex (1922)
 Dollar Devils (1923)
 Temporary Marriage (1923)
A Lady of Quality (1924)
The Family Secret (1924)
 The Tornado (1924)
Fifth Avenue Models (1925)
The Love Thief (1926)
Down the Stretch (1927)
The Claw (1927)
 Wild Beauty (1927)
Home, James (1928)
Second Choice (1930)
 Left Over Ladies (1931)
 Fury of the Jungle (1933)
 Before Midnight (1933)
The Most Precious Thing in Life (1934)
 Name the Woman (1934)
 One Is Guilty (1934)
The Unwelcome Stranger (1935)
 The Best Man Wins (1935)
Devil's Squadron (1936)
End of the Trail (1936)
Counterfeit (1936)
Intimate Relations (1937)
 Parents on Trial (1939)
The Secret Seven (1940)
The Lone Wolf Takes a Chance (1941)
Two Latins from Manhattan (1941)
 Tramp, Tramp, Tramp (1942)

External links 

American cinematographers
1892 births
1962 deaths
Austro-Hungarian emigrants to the United States